Cotton Petroleum Corp. v. New Mexico, 490 U.S. 163 (1989), was a United States Supreme Court case that decided states may impose taxes on non-Tribal commercial activity that takes place on Tribal land.

Background 
This case followed the earlier Supreme Court ruling in Merrion v. Jicarilla Apache Tribe (1982). In that case the high court approved of the Jicarilla Apache charging a severance tax for oil extraction on tribal land.

Accordingly, Cotton Petroleum, a non-Indian corporation, extracted oil and  agreed to pay the tribe a 6% severance tax. However, the State of New Mexico collected an additional 8% severance tax, which it levied on all oil producers in the State. Cotton paid the state tax in protest and filed this lawsuit, asserting that the state tax was preempted by federal law.

Opinion of the court 
The Court applied Bracker balancing, weighing state, Tribal and federal interests. Because the state provided Cotton $89,384 in services, the Court found sufficient state interest to justify the state tax. While amount collected in taxes, $2,293,953, far exceeded the value of the state services, the Court held there was no "proportionality requirement." The Court further explained that current case law allows states to impose non-discriminatory taxes on non-Tribal entities that do business with Tribes, noting that Congress could offer immunity if it chose to do so.

References

External links
 

United States Native American case law
United States Supreme Court cases
United States Supreme Court cases of the Rehnquist Court
1989 in United States case law
Legal history of New Mexico
Severance taxes
Taxation in New Mexico
Native American history of New Mexico
Jicarilla Apache
United States Native American tax case law
History of the petroleum industry in the United States